Denscantia is a genus of flowering plants in the family Rubiaceae. The genus is found in eastern Brazil.

Species
Denscantia andrei E.L.Cabral & Bacigalupo - southeastern Bahia
Denscantia cymosa (Spreng.) E.L.Cabral & Bacigalupo - eastern Brazil
Denscantia macrobracteata E.L.Cabral & Bacigalupo - eastern Bahia
Denscantia monodon (K.Schum.) E.L.Cabral & Bacigalupo - eastern Bahia

References

External links
Denscantia in the World Checklist of Rubiaceae

Rubiaceae genera
Spermacoceae